In My Eyes was an American, Boston, Massachusetts-based, straight edge band, that spearheaded the 1997 youth crew revival along with Follow Through, Ten Yard Fight, Bane, The Trust, Fastbreak and Floorpunch. The band and its members were a part of the hot bed that was the Boston music scene in the late 1990s and early 2000s. Members of the band also played in The Explosion, Fastbreak, and Panic. In My Eyes played their last show in October 2000, commemorating the second National Edge Day. The band was named after the Minor Threat song.

Members
 Sweet Pete - Vocals
 Damian Genuardi - Bass
 Luke Garro - Drums
 Neal St. Clair - Guitar
 Anthony Pappalardo - Guitar
 Jeff Neuman - Guitar (for the Nothing to Hide LP only)

Discography

Albums
 Demo - Big Wheel Recreation 1997
 The Difference Between - Revelation Records 1998
 Nothing to Hide - Revelation Records 2000

External links
Ankeny, Jason. In My Eyes. Retrieved December 14, 2011.
Thomas, David. The Difference Between review. Retrieved December 14, 2011.
Huey, Steve. Nothing to Hide review. Retrieved December 14, 2011.

Musical groups from Boston
Hardcore punk groups from Massachusetts
Straight edge groups